Hirslanden is Switzerland's largest private hospital group. As of 1 July 2017, the Hirslanden Private Hospital Group consists of 17 hospitals in 11 districts, many of which have an integrated outpatient surgery centre and emergency department. It has around 2 000 affiliated doctors and 9 920 permanent employees, 484 of whom are doctors.

During the 2016/17 financial year, Hirslanden recorded a turnover of CHF 1'704 million. The distribution of patients for this year included 44.8% of patients with basic insurance, 31.2% of patients with semi-private insurance and 24,0% of patients with private insurance.

The Hirslanden Private Hospital Group was formed in 1990 following the merger of several private clinics. The South African hospital group Mediclinic International bought it in 2007. 
Hirslanden is among the largest private hospital groups in Europe with over 100'000 inpatients for the 2016/17 period.

Location of the different clinics

History 

The name Hirslanden comes from the Klinik Hirslanden in Zurich opened in 1932 and was at that time located in the Hirslanden district (today Weinegg). The Hirslanden Private Hospital Group was launched in early July 1990 by merging the Hirslanden Klinik with four hospitals then owned by the AMI Group (American Medical International): Klinik Aarau (opened in 1988), Klinik Beau-Site in Bern (opened in 1945), Clinique Cecil in Lausanne (opened in 1931) and Klinik Im Park in Zurich (opened in 1986). The majority shareholder of the newly formed group was UBS.

In the following years, the group acquired many other private clinics: Klinik Permanence in Bern in 1997 (opened in 1978), Clinique Bois-Cerf in Lausanne in 1998, Klinik Belair in Schaffhausen and AndreasKlinik in Zug in 2001, Klinik Am Rosenberg in Heiden, Klinik Birshof in Basel and the Salem-Spital in Bern in 2002, Klinik St. Anna in Lucerne in 2005, Klinik Stephanshorn in St. Gallen in 2010, Klinik Meggen and Clinique La Colline in Geneva in 2014 and Privatklinik Linde in Biel/Bienne in 2017.

Within the Group's shareholders, two major changes can be noted so far: in 2002, the British investment group BC Partners Funds took over UBS and sold the Hirslanden Hospital Group to the South African Mediclinic Corporation in 2007.

Official website 
 Hirslanden Private Hospital Group

References 

Hospitals in Switzerland
Hospital networks